Dance Maharashtra Dance is an Indian television dance reality show in Marathi language originally aired on Zee Marathi. It was hosted by Sandeep Pathak and Vaibhav Mangle. Urmila Matondkar was the main judge of first season. Gashmeer Mahajani and Sonalee Kulkarni were the judges of Little Masters season. It was premiered from 17 December 2012 and stopped on 28 October 2022 aired with 3 seasons.

Seasons

References

External links 
 Dance Maharashtra Dance at ZEE5

Zee Marathi original programming
Zee Yuva original programming
Marathi-language television shows
Indian reality television series
2012 Indian television series debuts
2022 Indian television series endings